In wireless routing, inter-flow interference refers to the interference between neighboring routers competing for the same busy channel. 

The inter-flow interference routing metric is incorporated in MIC and iAWARE wireless routing protocol.

See also
 Collision domain
 Interference (communication)
 Intra-flow interference

References

Wi-Fi